MFK Karviná is a football club located in Karviná, Czech Republic. It plays in the Czech National Football League. The club took part in the Czech First League in 2016–2022. The team's colours are green and white.

History
Karviná as a multi-ethnic city of Cieszyn Silesia was a home to many football clubs, which were established by particular ethnic groups after World War I. At that time many football clubs of Polish, German, Czech and Jewish communities were founded. Most known and strongest Polish club was Polonia Karwina founded in 1919. After World War II German and Jewish clubs were not re-established. Czech and Polish clubs still existed until the 1950s, when as a part of communist unification of sport life in Czechoslovakia Czech clubs were joined to ZSJ OKD Mír Karviná and Polish Polonia Karwina incorporated into that club.

The club played at the top national level of competition in the 1996–97 Czech First League and 1998–99 Czech First League, being relegated on each occasion.

In the 2000–01 Czech 2. Liga, Karviná were relegated to the Moravian–Silesian Football League (MSFL) after finishing 15th of 16 teams. They subsequently finished last in the MSFL in the 2001–02 season, signalling a second relegation in as many seasons. The club, playing in the Czech Fourth Division in the 2002–03 season, finished dead last and was thus relegated for a third time in succession.

The club merged with Jäkl Karviná in 2003, taking the name MFK Karviná. The 2003–04 season saw the club play in the Regional Championship, finishing fourth but being promoted to the Czech Fourth Division due to higher-finishing teams declining the opportunity to promote. The club subsequently spent two seasons in the Czech Fourth Division, finishing fifth in their first season and third in the 2005–06 season, winning promotion to the MSFL. The club finished 8th in their first season back in the MSFL in 2006–07 and went on to finish fourth in the 2007–08 season. They then bought the license for the second division from league champions Sigma Olomouc B, and thus qualified to play in the Czech 2. Liga. Having played in the Second League since 2008, the club celebrated promotion to the First League after the 29th round of the 2015–16 Czech National Football League.

Historical names
 1919–38: PKS Polonia Karwina
 1945–48: SK Polonia Karwina
 1948–51: Sokol Polonia Karviná
 1951–53: Sokol OKD Mír Karviná
 1953–61: Baník Karviná Mír
 1961–94: Baník 1. máj Karviná
 1994–95: FC Karviná–Vítkovice (after merger with FC Vítkovice Kovkor)
 1995–03: FC Karviná
 2003–08: MFK Karviná (after merger with Jäkl Karviná)
 2008–present: MFK OKD Karviná

Players

Current squad

Out on loan

Notable former players

References

External links

 

 
Football clubs in the Czech Republic
Association football clubs established in 2003
Czech First League clubs
2003 establishments in the Czech Republic